Revelación is the fourth extended play by American singer Selena Gomez. It was released on March 12, 2021, by Interscope Records. Gomez collaborated with various producers, such as Albert Hype, DJ Snake, Jota Rosa, Maro, Neon16, and Tainy, to achieve her desired sound. She stated that the EP centers on themes of "strength, love, forgiveness and moving on".

The EP was supported by three singles: "De Una Vez", "Baila Conmigo" with Rauw Alejandro, and "Selfish Love" with DJ Snake, and is Gomez's first project to be prominently in Spanish language. It blends reggaeton, electropop, Latin pop, R&B and alternative R&B genres with urbano elements. It marks a departure from the dance-pop sound of its predecessor, Rare (2020). Upon release, Revelación received acclaim from music critics, who highlighted its tasteful production, and praised Gomez's expansion of her artistry. The EP became her best-reviewed project on Metacritic.

Commercially, Revelación debuted at number 22 on the US Billboard 200, shifting 23,000 equivalent album units in its first week of release, marking the biggest sales week for a Latin music album by a woman since Shakira's El Dorado (2017). It also debuted atop the Billboard Top Latin Albums chart. Four tracks from Revelación entered on the Billboard Hot Latin Songs chart dated March 27, 2021. The music video for its opening track, "De Una Vez", was nominated for Best Short Form Music Video at the 22nd Annual Latin Grammy Awards.

Revelación was nominated for Best Latin Pop Album at the 64th Annual Grammy Awards, earning Gomez her first nomination.

Background 
In a February 2020 interview with Dazed, Gomez revealed that she had plans to release Spanish-language music. To tease the unveiling of new music in Spanish, in January 2021, Gomez "quoted" a tweet from January 2011 that referenced a never-released Spanish-language album, stating: "I think it will be worth the wait".

Recording 
Recording of Revelación began right before the introduction of COVID-19 pandemic-related lockdowns; it was almost entirely recorded remotely, in a home recording studio, using Zoom to communicate. Gomez hired Leyla Hoyle-Guerrero, a language coach, to help restore her Spanish vocabulary, work on her accent, and practice her slang.

Composition
Revelación has been described as a reggaeton, electropop, Latin pop and both R&B and alternative R&B record, with influences of urbano. It marks a departure from the dance-pop sound of its predecessor, Rare (2020). Gomez stated that the EP's themes are "strength, love, forgiveness and moving on".

Release and promotion 
The EP's lead single, "De Una Vez", was released on January 14, 2021. Her first venture into Latin music since the release of the Spanish-language version of her former band Selena Gomez & the Scene 2010 single "A Year Without Rain", titled "Un Año Sin Lluvia", she described the song as "a beautiful love anthem". The music video, directed by Los Pérez premiered the same day.

The EP's release was announced on January 27, 2021, along with the announcement of its second single, "Baila Conmigo", featuring Puerto Rican rapper and singer Rauw Alejandro. The single was released as on January 29, 2021, and the EP was made available for pre-order the same day. The accompanying music video also premiered along the song and was directed by Brazilian filmmaker Fernando Nogari.

The third single from the project, a collaboration with French DJ and producer DJ Snake, titled "Selfish Love", was announced on February 25, 2021, and was released on March 4, 2021, alongside its music video, directed by Rodrigo Saavedra. The track marked the second partnership between the artists, first as a duo, following their 2018 hit single "Taki Taki" with Cardi B and Ozuna. The track listing for the EP was unveiled on March 2, 2021. In the days prior to Revelacións release, Gomez released previews of the songs yet to be released through social media.

 Tour 
When safe again, Gomez plans to embark on her first post-pandemic tour in Latin America.

Critical reception

Revelación was met with critical acclaim upon release. At Metacritic, which assigns a normalized score out of 100 to ratings from publications, the album received a weighted mean score of 83 based on 4 reviews, indicating "universal acclaim". The EP is Gomez's best-reviewed project on the site.

AllMusic's Matt Collar found Gomez remaining "artistically fearless" on Revelación, by taking up her Latin roots and sophisticating her pop sound furthermore, which ensued in a "romantic atmosphere that balances chic studio-cool with warm vulnerability". Hannah Mylrea of NME stated that the EP replaces "all-out pop belters" of Gomez's older catalog with "tasteful R&B and reggaeton" that shine new confidence. Entertainment Weekly writer Marcus Jones wrote that the project succeeds in establishing Gomez's ability "to toe the line", as she does not fully embrace urbano, but adds her own twist to it. He opined that the EP is a risky venture for Gomez, calling her "a far more versatile musician than she's been given credit for". Rolling Stone critic Lucas Villa viewed Revelación as Gomez's "captivating flirtation" with Latin music, through which she discovers "her groove among the reggaetón beats". He praised Gomez's "ASMR-ready" Spanish vocals as "alluring", and Tainy's "masterful" production that blurs the lines between pop and Latin music scenes. Villa further suggested that Gomez's Spanish venture deserves a full-length studio album. Gabriella Ferlita, writing for Gigwise, remarked that the EP is not ground-breaking, but "it is fun; and quite frankly, we could all use a bit of that". She picked "De Una Vez", "Baila Conmigo" and "Selfish Love" as the best tracks, while dismissing "Buscando Amor", "Dámelo To" and "Adiós" as outdated.

Awards and nominations

Revelación was nominated for Best Latin Pop Album at the 64th Annual Grammy Awards, marking Gomez's first career Grammy nomination. The album was also nominated for Favorite Pop Album at the Latin American Music Awards of 2022.

 Commercial performance 
Revelación debuted at number 22 on the US Billboard 200, shifting 23,000 equivalent album units in its first week of release, marking the biggest sales week for a Latin album by a woman since Shakira's El Dorado in 2017. It also debuted atop the Billboard Top Latin Albums chart, becoming the first album by a woman to do so, also since 2017's El Dorado. Four tracks from Revelación charted on the Billboard Hot Latin Songs chart on the chart dated March 27, 2021; "Baila Conmigo", which rose to number five; "Selfish Love" at number 18; "Dámelo To" at number 20, and "De Una Vez", which re-entered at number 50. In the same week, Gomez became the first female act to top the Billboard Top Latin Albums and Latin Airplay charts simultaneously since 2010, with the EP and "Baila Conmigo" respectively.

Outside of the US, Revelación peaked at number 2 in Portugal, number 4 in Spain and number 28 in the UK.

Track listingNotes  indicates a vocal producer

Personnel
Credits adapted from Tidal.Performers Selena Gomez – vocals , background vocals 
 Elena Rose – background vocals 
 Albert Hype – programming 
 Jota Rosa – programming 
 Tainy – programming 
 Kat Dahlia – background vocals 
 Nito – programming Technical Chris Gehringer – mastering engineer 
 Nicholas Mercier – mastering engineer, mix engineer 
 Serban Ghenea – mixer 
 DJ Snake – mixer 
 John Hanes – mix engineer 
 Angelo Carretta – engineer 
 Bart Schoudel – engineer , vocal engineer 
 Mick Raskin – assistant recording engineer 
 Andi Elloway – post-productionArtwork'

 Stephen Serrato – creative direction & graphic design
 Gerardo Santos – set design
 Camila Falquez – photographer
 Kate Young – wardrobe
 Orlando Pita – hair
 Hung Vanngo – make-up

Charts

Year-end charts

Release history

References

2021 EPs
Albums produced by Tainy
EPs by American artists
Interscope Records EPs
Latin music albums by American artists
Selena Gomez albums
Spanish-language EPs
Latin pop EPs
Reggaeton EPs